Miika Huttunen (also known as druidi Huttunen) is the editor-in-chief of the Finnish gaming magazine Pelaaja. Prior to this he was a host of certain game-related television programmes primarily on the now defunct MoonTV cable channel. He became recognised for hosting Peliuutiset (Game News) and continued hosting related topics on the more important shows such as Player and PC-Peliluola. He also hosted URL, infamously one of the last 15-minute shows on the channel alongside current editor-in-chief of Pelaaja, Thomas Puha. Unlike all other shows that Huttunen was in, URL was dedicated to the showing off and reviewing and/or insulting of web sites sent by fans.

Huttunen would later appear as a regular host and critic on the show Play on Nelonen alongside Huttunen and fellow MoonTV host Elias Poutanen. Play was cancelled in 2005. In late 2007 he appeared alongside Puha on the game segments of the program Extra Large on YLE Extra.

References

External links
 Pelaaja homepage

Finnish critics
Living people
Video game critics
Year of birth missing (living people)